The 2022 FIBA AmeriCup was the 19th edition of the FIBA AmeriCup, the main tournament for senior men's basketball national teams of the FIBA Americas. The tournament was played in Recife, Brazil, as Brasília was dropped as a second host city months before the tournament. It was originally scheduled to take place in 2021, but it was postponed due to the COVID-19 pandemic to 2 to 11 September 2022.

The 2022 FIBA AmeriCup concluded with Argentina winning the final against Brazil to win their third title. The United States secured the bronze medal with a victory over Canada.

Qualified teams

Twelve teams qualified for the final tournament.

Draw
The draw took place on 29 March 2022 in Miami, United States.

Squads

Preliminary round
All times are local (UTC−3).

Group A

Group B

Group C

Ranking of third-placed teams

Knockout stage
The matchups were as follows:
Best first placed-team against second best third-placed team.
Second best first-placed team against best third-placed team
Third best first-placed team against the second best second placed-team.
Remaining second placed teams.

Bracket

Quarterfinals

Semifinals

Third place game

Final

Final standings

Statistics and awards

Statistical leaders

Players

Points

Rebounds

Assists

Blocks

Steals

Efficiency

Teams

Points

Rebounds

Assists

Blocks

Steals

Efficiency

Awards
The awards were announced on 12 September 2022.

Notes

References

External links

Tournament summary

 
FIBA AmeriCup
2022–23 in South American basketball
2022–23 in North American basketball
September 2022 sports events in South America
Basketball events postponed due to the COVID-19 pandemic
2022 in Brazilian sport
International basketball competitions hosted by Brazil
Sport in Recife